Ungku Omar Polytechnic (PUO) is a polytechnic situated at Jalan Dairy (Jalan Raja Musa Mahadi), Ipoh which was named after the Ungku Omar bin Ungku Ahmad. It was established by the Malaysian Ministry of Education with help from UNESCO in 1969. It also received RM24.5 million funding from the United Nations Development Programme (UNDP). UNESCO was responsible for its construction. Ungku Omar Polytechnic is the first and the oldest polytechnic in Malaysia.

History
Ungku Omar Polytechnic was established in 1969 by the Malaysian Ministry of Education, aided by UNESCO. A total of RM24.5 million was allocated by the United Nation Development Programme (UNDP). UNESCO was assigned with the responsibility of planning and executing the polytechnic's construction on an area of 22.6 hectares at Dairy Road, Ipoh. The polytechnic was named after the late Dato' Professor Ungku Omar Ahmad, in recognition of his valuable contributions to the nation, especially in the field of medical research.

For the first batch of 300 students, lectures were held beginning from 2 June 1969. At that time, the academic workforce consisted of 28 local lecturers. During the early stages, PUO only had four academic departments, namely the Civil Engineering Department, Electrical Engineering Department, Mechanical Engineering Department and Commerce Department, which offered various academic programmes at diploma and certificate levels.

Departments
 Civil Engineering 
 Civil Engineering (DKA)
 Geomatic Engineering (DGU)
 Architecture (DSB)
 Electrical Engineering
 Communication (DEP)
 Computer Technology (DTK)
 Mechanical Engineering
 Mechanical Engineering (DKM)
 Automotive (DAD)
 Air-conditioning & Refrigerating (DPU)
 Mechatronics (DEM)
 Marine Engineering
 Marine Engineering (DKP)
 Commerce
 Business Studies (DPM)
 Financial and Banking (DKB)
 Accountancy (DAT)
 Retail management (DRM)
 Islamic Banking and Finance (DIB)
 General Studies
 Islamic Studies
 Moral Studies
 English Language
 Chinese Language
 Japanese Language
 Information & Communication Technology
 Digital Technology (DDT)
 Network System (DNS)
 Information Security (DIS)
 Mathematics, Science and Computer

References

External links 
 Official portal of Politeknik Ungku Omar

Universities and colleges in Perak
Engineering universities and colleges in Malaysia
Business schools in Malaysia
Information technology schools in Malaysia
1969 establishments in Malaysia
Educational institutions established in 1969
Polytechnics in Malaysia
Technical universities and colleges in Malaysia